Turbonilla kerstinae is a species of sea snail, a marine gastropod mollusk in the family Pyramidellidae, the pyrams and their allies.

Description
The shell grows to a length of 3.5 mm.

Distribution
This marine species occurs in the following locations:
 Angola
 Cape Verde
 Mauritania

References

External links
 To Biodiversity Heritage Library (1 publication)
 To Encyclopedia of Life
 To World Register of Marine Species

kerstinae
Gastropods described in 1994
Molluscs of the Atlantic Ocean
Molluscs of Angola
Gastropods of Cape Verde
Invertebrates of West Africa